Alexey Viktorovich Barinov (born December 30, 1951) is a Russian businessman and politician.

In 1974 he graduated from the Tyumen Industrial Institute, and in 1987 from the Moscow Institute of the Petrochemical and Gas Industry. Barinov worked in various oil and gas enterprises of Western Siberia throughout 1990s. From 1999 he was a member of the board of Murmansk Shipping Company.

In June 2000, he was elected a deputy of Arkhangelsk Regional Assembly from Severodvinsk. Layer he resigned as a member of the Assembly moving to the staff of the Envoy in the North Western Federal District. From April 2003 to August 2004 Barinov was federal inspector for Nenets Autonomous Okrug.

In 2005, he was elected governor of Nenets Autonomous Okrug. On May 24, 2006, he was arrested and on July 21 dismissed by President Vladimir Putin from his position. In September 2007, the Oktyabrsky Court of Arkhangelsk acquitted Barinov of all charges except for privatization of an apartment in Arkhangelsk given to him by Lukoil, for which he was sentenced to 3 years of suspended imprisonment.

External links
«Коммерсантъ», #30 (3606), February 27, 2007. Алексей Баринов вошёл в курс своего дела.
Regnum.ru.  С экс-губернатора Ненецкого АО сняли судимость

References 

Russian businesspeople in transport
Living people
1951 births
Governors of Nenets Autonomous Okrug
Heads of government who were later imprisoned
Businesspeople in shipping
People from Sughd Region